Terravision is an Italian coach services operator offering airport connections in various major cities throughout Europe.

History
To respond to the boom of low cost flights in the early 1990s, Fabio Petroni created the Terravision Group. The company opened its first route, between Ciampino Airport and Rome city centre, in 2002 and now has more than 18 airport transfer services all over Europe carrying more than 10,000 passengers per day. In October 2013 Terravision formed an alliance with City Sightseeing that will see it sell bus tour tickets. The firm employs more than 300 people worldwide. One of its competitors in the United Kingdom is easyBus.

Services

Terravision operates coach services connecting major airports with nearby cities. As of August 2019, one or more routes exist in the areas of London, Rome, Milan, Florence/Pisa, Palermo, Bari, Eindhoven, Amsterdam, Malta, Porto, Barcelona and the Dolomites.

References

External links

Official website

London bus operators
Bus operators in Essex
Bus companies of Italy
Coach operators in England
Companies based in Rome
Italian companies established in 2002
Transport companies established in 2002